The 2012 Ventforet Kofu season sees Ventforet Kofu return to J.League Division 2 after being relegated from Division 1. This is their 36th non-consecutive season in the second tier of Japanese football, the longest number of seasons for a club in the division. Ventforet Kofu are also competing in the 2012 Emperor's Cup.

After 36 seasons of tries, Ventforet Kofu won their first second-tier title.

Players

Competitions

J.League

League table

Matches

Emperor's Cup

References

Ventforet Kofu
Ventforet Kofu seasons